Tingena ophiodryas is a species of moth in the family Oecophoridae. It is endemic to New Zealand and has been observed in Canterbury.

Taxonomy 
This species was first described by Edward Meyrick in 1936 and named Borkhausenia ophiodryas using a specimen collected by S. Lindsay in the bush above Le Bon's Bay, on Banks Peninsula in February.  In 1939 George Hudson discussed and illustrated this species under the name B. ophiodryas. In 1988 J. S. Dugdale placed this species in the genus Tingena. The female holotype specimen, collected at Little River, Banks Peninsula, is held at the Canterbury Museum.

Description

Meyrick described this species as follows:

Distribution 
This species is endemic to New Zealand and has been observed in Canterbury.

Behaviour 
The adults of this species are on the wing in February.

References

Oecophoridae
Moths of New Zealand
Moths described in 1936
Endemic fauna of New Zealand
Taxa named by Edward Meyrick
Endemic moths of New Zealand